Barbara Zięba (born 20 March 1952) is a Polish gymnast. She competed in six events at the 1968 Summer Olympics.

References

1952 births
Living people
Polish female artistic gymnasts
Olympic gymnasts of Poland
Gymnasts at the 1968 Summer Olympics
Sportspeople from Kraków